Eduardo Fernández Meyzán (30 April 1923–27 November 2002) was a Peruvian footballer.

Career
Born in San Vicente de Cañete, "Lolo" Fernández played club football for Universitario de Deportes from 1939 to 1946, winning five local championships. In 1947, he played in the Argentine Primera Division for Club Atlético Vélez Sársfield.

References

1923 births
2002 deaths
People from Lima Region
Peruvian footballers
Club Universitario de Deportes footballers
Sport Boys footballers
Atlético Chalaco footballers
Club Atlético Vélez Sarsfield footballers
Peruvian expatriate footballers
Expatriate footballers in Argentina

Association footballers not categorized by position